Lorna Harper (born 5 June 1969) was elected to the Western Australian Legislative Council as a Labor Party member for East Metropolitan region at the 2021 state election.

References 

Living people
Members of the Western Australian Legislative Council
Place of birth missing (living people)
Australian Labor Party members of the Parliament of Western Australia
21st-century Australian politicians
Women members of the Western Australian Legislative Council
1969 births
21st-century Australian women politicians